Akbar Rasyid is an Indonesian national football player who currently plays for Pusamania Borneo F.C. His position is midfielder.

Honours

Club honors
Persisam Putra Samarinda
 Premier Division: 2008–09

References

External links
 Profile at goal.com
 

1983 births
Living people
Indonesian footballers
Sportspeople from Makassar
PSM Makassar players
Persmin Minahasa players
Arema F.C. players
Persisam Putra Samarinda players
Persebaya Surabaya players
Liga 1 (Indonesia) players
Indonesian Premier Division players
Association football midfielders
Borneo F.C. players